Stephen Warren (November 3, 1815 – February 28, 1898) was a member of the Wisconsin State Assembly.

Biography
Warren was born on November 3, 1815, in Hawkesbury, Ontario. On May 7, 1840, he married Mary Y. Nicholson in Hartland, Wisconsin. They had two children before her death in 1891. Warren died in Hartland on February 28, 1898, and was buried there.

His brother, Dewey, was also a member of the Assembly. His former home, now known as the Stephen Warren House, is listed on the National Register of Historic Places.

Career
Warren was a member of the Assembly during the 1855 session. He was a Republican.

References

External links
 

People from Hawkesbury, Ontario
Pre-Confederation Ontario people
Pre-Confederation Canadian emigrants to the United States
People from Hartland, Wisconsin
Republican Party members of the Wisconsin State Assembly
1815 births
1898 deaths
Burials in Wisconsin
19th-century American politicians